On April 26, 2018, an explosion and subsequent fire occurred at the Husky Energy Oil Refinery in Superior, Wisconsin. An initial explosion was reported at 10:00 AM and was extinguished close to noon, however a piece of debris had hit a storage tank containing asphalt, which ignited after spilling across the refinery, sending a thick plume of black smoke into the air. Thirty-six people, including 11 refinery employees, were sent to local hospitals, but there were ultimately no fatalities. Residents 3 miles to the east and west of the refinery, 2 miles to the north, and 10 miles to the south were evacuated from their homes temporarily due to concerns of both the toxicity of the smoke affecting those who lived south of the refinery and concerns regarding the plant's hydrofluoric acid tank causing further damage.

Background 
The oil refinery in Superior, Wisconsin, which processes 50,000 barrels of oil a day, was acquired by Husky Energy from Calumet Specialty Products Partners in November 2017, retaining 180 Calumet employees. The company processes heavy oil from oil sands and conventional operations in western Canada. The refinery has a partnership with the Superior Fire Department, which provides its personnel training and resources when fighting industrial fires. It was eventually acquired by Canadian company Cenovus Energy in March 2021.

Early morning closure 
On the morning of the explosion, at 5:30 a.m., refinery workers were planning to shut down the Fluid Catalytic Cracking Unit (FCCU) of the refinery for routine maintenance. The FCCU is used to break down hydrocarbons from crude oil into smaller hydrocarbons, which can blend into products such as gasoline. When the FCCU is shut down, slide valves in the middle of the unit are used as a barrier between a reactor, containing flammable hydrocarbons, and a regenerator, containing air. If the hydrocarbons and air mix, an explosion can occur. On the morning of the incident, workers attempted to stop the flow of hydrocarbons to the regenerating unit, however, one of the valves was eroded, causing air to flow upward into the reactor, into equipment that contained flammable hydrocarbons.

Explosion and fire 
The mix of the air and hydrocarbons caused a massive explosion in the FCCU at approximately 10:00 a.m. that morning. The explosion sent debris flying 200 feet, one piece puncturing a hole in an above-ground storage tank that contained around 50,000 barrels of asphalt, causing the asphalt to spill along the ground into the refinery's main units. The asphalt ignited near additional storage tanks, eventually traveling to the FCCU of the refinery, causing a fire producing thick black smoke to travel into the air. The smoke went so far into the sky, it was picked up on weather radar.

Evacuation 
The black smoke traveled southeast as far as Solon Springs in Douglas County. An evacuation of the plant was ordered at 1:00 p.m., however at 2:41 p.m., an evacuation for residents 10 miles south of the plant was ordered due to concerns of the toxicity of the huge plumes of black smoke. Residents who lived 3 miles north, east, and south of the refinery were also ordered to evacuate due to concerns about the change in the direction of the wind forcing the toxic smoke above more homes, and due to concerns about the refinery's hydrofluoric acid tank causing potential further explosions and damage. Schools in the Superior School District as well as the Essentia Health-St. Mary's Medical Center in Superior was also urged to evacuate. Students were evacuated to an AMSOIL building in northwestern Superior. Schools in the Maple School District in Douglas County were also closed as a precaution. Those injured were taken to hospitals in Duluth, Minnesota.

Firefight 
The fire was initially expected to burn for days. The refinery's emergency response team, as well as the Superior Fire Department, initially went defensive against the fire due to concerns of safety due to the intense heat as well as other units of the refinery which were a cause of concern. A plan was developed at around 3 p.m. The large asphalt fire was extinguished with foam, and the fires around the crude unit of the refinery were extinguished with dry chemical fire extinguisher and water. The fire was fully extinguished at 7 p.m., however the evacuation order remained in place until 6 am the next day due to concerns regarding the stability of the plant's hydrogen fluoride tank.

Investigation, lawsuit, and aftermath

CSB Investigation 
The United States Chemical Safety Board, or USCSB, released their final report on the incident on December 29, 2022, saying that the incident "could have been prevented," citing that the debris that was ejected into the air and hit the asphalt tank which caused the fire, could have hit a tank of highly hazardous hydrogen fluoride, since the tank was approximately 150 feet away from the explosion site, 50 feet closer than the damaged asphalt tank. The board also suggested to the Superior refinery to implement safeguards to prevent explosions in the cracking unit and a "slide valve mechanical integrity program that addresses erosion and ensures proper functioning of the slide valves during a shutdown."

Cenovus put out a statement after the report stating that the refinery is cooperating with the CSB to implement their recommendations into the refinery's rebuild, one of them being "new state-of-the-art slide valves in the Fluid Catalytic Cracking unit with enhanced safeguards such as advanced instrumentation to monitor performance in real-time and ensure the operations and engineering staff can carefully assess performance."

Hydrogen-fluoride controversy 
Controversy began to rise surrounding the facility's use of HF. Superior Mayor Jim Paine and Duluth Mayor Emily Larson have publicly come forward expressing disapproval with the plant's use of the chemical, citing multiple safety hazards to the surrounding communities had the HF tank been affected by the fire.

Lawsuit 
Husky Energy faced a class-action lawsuit against residents who were forced to evacuate their homes, citing a section from the report of the USCSB that stated that their equipment "failed to separate oxygen and hydrocarbons, allowing a flammable mixture to form." Husky reached a $1M settlement in July 2021.

Rebuild 
Reconstruction of the refinery began in the fall of 2019, and is expected to become fully operational in early 2023. Construction was halted in May 2020 due to the COVID-19 pandemic, but was resumed in June 2020.

"Husky Friends" 
In April 2022, close to the fourth anniversary of the explosion, a group claiming to be a PR firm for Cenovus Energy called "Husky Friends" sent Superior residents postcards and kits containing things such as information about hydrogen fluoride. Cenovus came forward after the group began to announce their campaign to the press saying that they have no ties to the organization. The group's spokesperson told a local news channel in Duluth that the group's intent was to warn people about the dangers of HF using satire. The company has not filed legal action against the firm or announced any plans to.

References 

Industrial fires and explosions in the United States
Douglas County, Wisconsin
Superior, Wisconsin
April 2018 events in the United States
Husky Energy
2018 in Wisconsin